Piz Plavna Dadaint is a mountain in the Sesvenna Range of the Alps, located between the Val Sampuoir and the Val Plavna in the canton of Graubünden.

References

External links
 Piz Plavna Dadaint on Hikr

Mountains of Graubünden
Mountains of the Alps
Alpine three-thousanders
Mountains of Switzerland